Liliales is an order of monocotyledonous flowering plants in the Angiosperm Phylogeny Group and Angiosperm Phylogeny Web system, within the lilioid monocots. Both the order Lililiales and the family Liliaceae have had a widely disputed history, with the circumscription varying greatly from one taxonomist to another. Previous members of this order, which at one stage included most monocots with  conspicuous tepals and lacking starch in the endosperm are now distributed over three orders, Liliales, Dioscoreales and Asparagales, using predominantly molecular phylogenetics. The newly delimited Liliales is monophyletic, with ten families. Thus circumscribed, this order consists mostly of herbaceous plants, but lianas and shrubs also occur. They are mostly perennial plants, with food storage organs such as corms or rhizomes. The order has worldwide distribution, and consists of 10 families, 67 genera and about 1,768 species.

The anthophytes are a grouping of plant taxa bearing flower-like reproductive structures. They were formerly thought to be a clade comprising plants bearing flower-like structures.  The group contained the angiosperms - the extant flowering plants, such as roses and grasses - as well as the Gnetales and the extinct Bennettitales.

23,420 species of vascular plant have been recorded in South Africa, making it the sixth most species-rich country in the world and the most species-rich country on the African continent. Of these, 153 species are considered to be threatened. Nine biomes have been described in South Africa: Fynbos, Succulent Karoo, desert, Nama Karoo, grassland, savanna, Albany thickets, the Indian Ocean coastal belt, and forests.

The 2018 South African National Biodiversity Institute's National Biodiversity Assessment plant checklist lists 35,130 taxa in the phyla Anthocerotophyta (hornworts (6)), Anthophyta (flowering plants (33534)), Bryophyta (mosses (685)), Cycadophyta (cycads (42)), Lycopodiophyta (Lycophytes(45)), Marchantiophyta (liverworts (376)), Pinophyta (conifers (33)), and Pteridophyta (cryptogams (408)).

Five families are represented in the literature. Listed taxa include species, subspecies, varieties, and forms as recorded, some of which have subsequently been allocated to other taxa as synonyms, in which cases the accepted taxon is appended to the listing. Multiple entries under alternative names reflect taxonomic revision over time.

Alstroemeriaceae
Family: Alstroemeriaceae,

Alstroemeria
Genus Alstroemeria:
 Alstroemeria pulchella L.f. not indigenous, cultivated, naturalised

Colchicaceae
Family: Colchicaceae,

Androcymbium
Genus Androcymbium:
 Androcymbium albanense Schonland, accepted as Colchicum albanense (Schonland) J.C.Manning & Vinn. indigenous
 Androcymbium albanense Schonland subsp. clanwilliamense Pedrola, Membrives & J.M.Monts. accepted as Colchicum clanwilliamense (Pedrola, Membrives & J.M.Monts.) J.C.Manning & Vinn. endemic
 Androcymbium albomarginatum Schinz, accepted as Colchicum albomarginatum (Schinz) J.C.Manning & Vinn. endemic
 Androcymbium asteroides J.C.Manning & Goldblatt, accepted as Colchicum asteroides (J.C.Manning & Goldblatt) J.C.Manning & Vinn. endemic
 Androcymbium austrocapense U.Mull.-Doblies & D.Mull.-Doblies, accepted as Colchicum austrocapense (U.Mull.-Doblies & D.Mull.-Doblies) J.C.Manning & Vinn. endemic
 Androcymbium bellum Schltr. & K.Krause, accepted as Colchicum bellum (Schltr. & K.Krause) J.C.Manning & Vinn. indigenous
 Androcymbium burchellii Baker, accepted as Colchicum coloratum J.C.Manning & Vinn. subsp. burchellii (Baker) J.C.Manning & Vinn. endemic
 Androcymbium burkei Baker, accepted as Colchicum burkei (Baker) J.C.Manning & Vinn. indigenous
 Androcymbium capense (L.) K.Krause, accepted as Colchicum capense (L.) J.C.Manning & Vinn. subsp. capense, endemic
 Androcymbium cedarbergense U.Mull.-Doblies, Hahnl, U.U.Mull.-Doblies & D.Mull.-Doblies, accepted as Colchicum cedarbergense (U.Mull.-Doblies, Hahnl. U.U.Mull.-Doblies & D.Mull.-Doblies) J.C.Manning &, endemic
 Androcymbium ciliolatum Schltr. & K.Krause, accepted as Colchicum capense (L.) J.C.Manning & Vinn. subsp. ciliolatum (Schltr. & K.Krause) J.C.Manning & Vinn, endemic
 Androcymbium circinatum Baker, accepted as Colchicum circinatum (Baker) J.C.Manning & Vinn. indigenous
 Androcymbium circinatum Baker subsp. vestitum U.Mull.-Doblies & D.Mull.-Doblies, accepted as Colchicum circinatum (Baker) J.C.Manning & Vinn. subsp. vestitum (U.Mull.-Doblies & D.Mull.-Doblies), endemic
 Androcymbium crenulatum U.Mull.-Doblies, E.G.H.Oliv. & D.Mull.-Doblies, accepted as Colchicum crenulatum (U.Mull.-Doblies, E.G.H.Oliv. & D.Mull.-Doblies) J.C.Manning & Vinn. endemic
 Androcymbium crispum Schinz, accepted as Colchicum crispum (Schinz) J.C.Manning & Vinn. endemic
 Androcymbium cruciatum U.Mull.-Doblies & D.Mull.-Doblies, accepted as Colchicum cruciatum (U.Mull.-Doblies & D.Mull.-Doblies) J.C.Manning & Vinn. endemic
 Androcymbium cuspidatum Baker, accepted as Colchicum cuspidatum (Baker) J.C.Manning & Vinn. endemic
 Androcymbium decipiens N.E.Br. accepted as Colchicum decipiens (N.E.Br.) J.C.Manning & Vinn. endemic
 Androcymbium dregei C.Presl, accepted as Colchicum dregei (C.Presl) J.C.Manning & Vinn. endemic
 Androcymbium eghimocymbion U.Mull.-Doblies & D.Mull.-Doblies, accepted as Colchicum eghimbocymbion (U.Mull.-Doblies & D.Mull.-Doblies) J.C.Manning & Vinn. endemic
 Androcymbium eucomoides (Jacq.) Willd. accepted as Colchicum eucomoides (Jacq.) J.C.Manning & Vinn. endemic
 Androcymbium exiguum Roessler subsp. vogelii (U.Mull.-Doblies & D.Mull.-Doblies) U.Mull.-Doblies & D, accepted as Colchicum exiguum (Roessler) J.C.Manning & Vinn. subsp. vogelii (U.Mull.-Doblies & D.Mull.-Doblies), indigenous
 Androcymbium greuterocymbium U.Mull.-Doblies, Raus & D.Mull.-Doblies, accepted as Colchicum greuterocymbium (U.Mull.-Doblies, Raus & D.Mull.-Doblies) J.C.Manning & Vinn. endemic
 Androcymbium guttatum Schltr. & K.Krause, accepted as Colchicum circinatum (Baker) J.C.Manning & Vinn. subsp. circinatum, present
 Androcymbium hantamense Engl. accepted as Colchicum hantamense (Engl.) J.C.Manning & Vinn. endemic
 Androcymbium henssenianum U.Mull.-Doblies & D.Mull.-Doblies, accepted as Colchicum henssenianum (U.Mull.-Doblies & D.Mull.-Doblies) J.C.Manning & Vinn. endemic
 Androcymbium hughocymbion U.Mull.-Doblies & D.Mull.-Doblies, accepted as Colchicum hughocymbion (U.Mull.-Doblies & D.Mull.-Doblies) J.C.Manning & Vinn. endemic
 Androcymbium huntleyi Pedrola, Membrives, J.M.Monts. & Caujape, accepted as Colchicum huntleyi (Pedrola, Membrives, J.M.Monts. & Caujape) J.C.Manning & Vinn. endemic
 Androcymbium irroratum Schltr. & K.Krause, accepted as Colchicum irroratum (Schltr. & K.Krause) J.C.Manning & Vinn. endemic
 Androcymbium karooparkense U.Mull.-Doblies, Daber, J.M.Anderson & D.Mull.-Doblies, accepted as Colchicum karooparkense (U.Mull.-Doblies, Daber, J.M.Anderson & D.Mull.-Doblies) J.C.Manning & Vinn. endemic
 Androcymbium knersvlaktense U.Mull.-Doblies & D.Mull.-Doblies, accepted as Colchicum knersvlaktense (U.Mull.-Doblies & D.Mull.-Doblies) J.C.Manning & Vinn. endemic
 Androcymbium kunkelianum U.Mull.-Doblies, P.Hirsch, Stearn & D.Mull.-Doblies, accepted as Colchicum kunkelianum (U.Mull.-Doblies, P.Hirsch, Stearn & D.Mull.-Doblies) J.C.Manning & Vinn. endemic
 Androcymbium latifolium Schinz, accepted as Colchicum coloratum J.C.Manning & Vinn. subsp. coloratum, endemic
 Androcymbium leistneri U.Mull.-Doblies & D.Mull.-Doblies, accepted as Colchicum leistneri (U.Mull.-Doblies & D.Mull.-Doblies) C.Archer, indigenous
 Androcymbium longipes Baker, accepted as Colchicum longipes (Baker) J.C.Manning & Vinn. endemic
 Androcymbium melanthioides Willd. accepted as Colchicum melanthoides (Willd.) J.C.Manning & Vinn. 
 Androcymbium melanthioides Willd. subsp. australe U.Mull.-Doblies & D.Mull.-Doblies, accepted as Colchicum melanthoides (Willd.) J.C.Manning & Vinn. subsp. australe (U.Mull.-Doblies & D.Mull.-Dobli, endemic
 Androcymbium melanthioides Willd. subsp. transvaalense U.Mull.-Doblies & D.Mull.-Doblies, accepted as Colchicum melanthoides (Willd.) J.C.Manning & Vinn. subsp. transvaalense (U.Mull.-Doblies & D.Mull.-, indigenous
 Androcymbium melanthioides Willd. var. striatum (A.Rich.) Baker, accepted as Colchicum striatum (Hochst. ex A.Rich.) J.C.Manning & Vinn. present
 Androcymbium melanthioides Willd. var. subulatum (Baker) Baker, accepted as Colchicum melanthoides (Willd.) J.C.Manning & Vinn. subsp. transvaalense (U.Mull.-Doblies & D.Mull.-, present
 Androcymbium natalense Baker, accepted as Colchicum natalense (Baker) J.C.Manning & Vinn. endemic
 Androcymbium orienticapense U.Mull.-Doblies & D.Mull.-Doblies, accepted as Colchicum orienticapense (U.Mull.-Doblies & D.Mull.-Doblies) J.C.Manning & Vinn. endemic
 Androcymbium poeltianum U.Mull.-Doblies & D.Mull.-Doblies, accepted as Colchicum poeltianum (U.Mull.-Doblies & D.Mull.-Doblies) J.C.Manning & Vinn. endemic
 Androcymbium praeirroratum U.Mull.-Doblies & D.Mull.-Doblies, accepted as Colchicum praeirroratum (U.Mull.-Doblies & D.Mull.-Doblies) J.C.Manning & Vinn. endemic
 Androcymbium pulchrum Schltr. & K.Krause, accepted as Colchicum coloratum J.C.Manning & Vinn. subsp. coloratum, present
 Androcymbium roseum Engl. accepted as Colchicum roseum (Engl.) J.C.Manning & Vinn. present
 Androcymbium scabromarginatum Schltr. & K.Krause, accepted as Colchicum scabromarginatum (Schltr. & K.Krause) J.C.Manning & Vinn. endemic
 Androcymbium schlechteri K.Krause, accepted as Colchicum albomarginatum (Schinz) J.C.Manning & Vinn. present
 Androcymbium stirtonii U.Mull.-Doblies, Raus, Weiglin & D.Mull.-Doblies, accepted as Colchicum stirtonii (U.Mull.-Doblies & D.Mull.-Doblies) J.C.Manning & Vinn. endemic
 Androcymbium striatum Hochst. ex A.Rich. accepted as Colchicum striatum (Hochst. ex A.Rich.) J.C.Manning & Vinn. indigenous
 Androcymbium swazicum U.Mull.-Doblies & D.Mull.-Doblies, accepted as Colchicum swazicum (U.Mull.-Doblies & D.Mull.-Doblies) J.C.Manning & Vinn. indigenous
 Androcymbium undulatum U.Mull.-Doblies & D.Mull.-Doblies, accepted as Colchicum undulatum (U.Mull.-Doblies & D.Mull.-Doblies) J.C.Manning & Vinn. endemic
 Androcymbium vanjaarsveldii U.Mull.-Doblies, Hahnl, U.U.Mull.-Doblies & D.Mull.-Doblies, accepted as Colchicum vanjaarsveldii (U.Mull.-Doblies, Hahnl. U.U.Mull.-Doblies & D.Mull.-Doblies) J.C.Manning, endemic
 Androcymbium villosum U.Mull.-Doblies & D.Mull.-Doblies, accepted as Colchicum villosum (U.Mull.-Doblies & D.Mull.-Doblies) J.C.Manning & Vinn. endemic
 Androcymbium volutare Burch. accepted as Colchicum volutare (Burch.) J.C.Manning & Vinn. endemic
 Androcymbium walteri Pedrola, Membrives & J.M.Monts. accepted as Colchicum walteri (Pedrola, Membrives & J.M.Monts.) J.C.Manning & Vinn. endemic
 Androcymbium worsonense U.Mull.-Doblies & D.Mull.-Doblies, accepted as Colchicum worsonense (U.Mull.-Doblies & D.Mull.-Doblies) J.C.Manning & Vinn. endemic

Baeometra
Genus Baeometra:
 Baeometra uniflora (Jacq.) G.J.Lewis, endemic

Camptorrhiza
Genus Camptorrhiza:
 Camptorrhiza strumosa (Baker) Oberm. indigenous

Colchicum
Genus Colchicum:
 Colchicum albanense (Schonland) J.C.Manning & Vinn. endemic
 Colchicum albofenestratum J.C.Manning & Snijman, endemic
 Colchicum albomarginatum (Schinz) J.C.Manning & Vinn. endemic
 Colchicum amphigaripense (U.Mull.-Doblies, Weiglin, M.Gottlieb & D.U.Mull.-Doblies) J.C.Manning & Vi, indigenous
 Colchicum asteroides (J.C.Manning & Goldblatt) J.C.Manning & Vinn. endemic
 Colchicum austrocapense (U.Mull.-Doblies & D.Mull.-Doblies) J.C.Manning & Vinn. endemic
 Colchicum bellum (Schltr. & K.Krause) J.C.Manning & Vinn. indigenous
 Colchicum burkei (Baker) J.C.Manning & Vinn. indigenous
 Colchicum capense (L.) J.C.Manning & Vinn. endemic
 Colchicum capense (L.) J.C.Manning & Vinn. subsp. capense, endemic
 Colchicum capense (L.) J.C.Manning & Vinn. subsp. ciliolatum (Schltr. & K.Krause) J.C.Manning & Vinn, endemic
 Colchicum cedarbergense (U.Mull.-Doblies, Hahnl. U.U.Mull.-Doblies & D.Mull.-Doblies) J.C.Manning &, endemic
 Colchicum circinatum (Baker) J.C.Manning & Vinn. endemic
 Colchicum circinatum (Baker) J.C.Manning & Vinn. subsp. circinatum, endemic
 Colchicum circinatum (Baker) J.C.Manning & Vinn. subsp. vestitum (U.Mull.-Doblies & D.Mull.-Doblies), endemic
 Colchicum clanwilliamense (Pedrola, Membrives & J.M.Monts.) J.C.Manning & Vinn. endemic
 Colchicum coloratum J.C.Manning & Vinn. endemic
 Colchicum coloratum J.C.Manning & Vinn. subsp. burchellii (Baker) J.C.Manning & Vinn. endemic
 Colchicum coloratum J.C.Manning & Vinn. subsp. coloratum, endemic
 Colchicum crenulatum (U.Mull.-Doblies, E.G.H.Oliv. & D.Mull.-Doblies) J.C.Manning & Vinn. endemic
 Colchicum crispum (Schinz) J.C.Manning & Vinn. endemic
 Colchicum cruciatum (U.Mull.-Doblies & D.Mull.-Doblies) J.C.Manning & Vinn. endemic
 Colchicum cuspidatum (Baker) J.C.Manning & Vinn. indigenous
 Colchicum decipiens (N.E.Br.) J.C.Manning & Vinn. endemic
 Colchicum dregei (C.Presl) J.C.Manning & Vinn. endemic
 Colchicum eghimbocymbion (U.Mull.-Doblies & D.Mull.-Doblies) J.C.Manning & Vinn. endemic
 Colchicum eucomoides (Jacq.) J.C.Manning & Vinn. endemic
 Colchicum exiguum (Roessler) J.C.Manning & Vinn. indigenous
 Colchicum exiguum (Roessler) J.C.Manning & Vinn. subsp. vogelii (U.Mull.-Doblies & D.Mull.-Doblies), endemic
 Colchicum greuterocymbium (U.Mull.-Doblies, Raus & D.Mull.-Doblies) J.C.Manning & Vinn. endemic
 Colchicum hantamense (Engl.) J.C.Manning & Vinn. endemic
 Colchicum henssenianum (U.Mull.-Doblies & D.Mull.-Doblies) J.C.Manning & Vinn. endemic
 Colchicum hughocymbion (U.Mull.-Doblies & D.Mull.-Doblies) J.C.Manning & Vinn. endemic
 Colchicum huntleyi (Pedrola, Membrives, J.M.Monts. & Caujape) J.C.Manning & Vinn. endemic
 Colchicum irroratum (Schltr. & K.Krause) J.C.Manning & Vinn. endemic
 Colchicum karooparkense (U.Mull.-Doblies, Daber, J.M.Anderson & D.Mull.-Doblies) J.C.Manning & Vinn. endemic
 Colchicum knersvlaktense (U.Mull.-Doblies & D.Mull.-Doblies) J.C.Manning & Vinn. endemic
 Colchicum kunkelianum (U.Mull.-Doblies, P.Hirsch, Stearn & D.Mull.-Doblies) J.C.Manning & Vinn. endemic
 Colchicum leistneri (U.Mull.-Doblies & D.Mull.-Doblies) C.Archer, indigenous
 Colchicum longipes (Baker) J.C.Manning & Vinn. endemic
 Colchicum melanthoides (Willd.) J.C.Manning & Vinn. indigenous
 Colchicum melanthoides (Willd.) J.C.Manning & Vinn. subsp. australe (U.Mull.-Doblies & D.Mull.-Dobli, endemic
 Colchicum melanthoides (Willd.) J.C.Manning & Vinn. subsp. melanthoides, indigenous
 Colchicum melanthoides (Willd.) J.C.Manning & Vinn. subsp. transvaalense (U.Mull.-Doblies & D.Mull.-, indigenous
 Colchicum natalense]] (Baker) J.C.Manning & Vinn. endemic
 Colchicum orienticapense (U.Mull.-Doblies & D.Mull.-Doblies) J.C.Manning & Vinn. endemic
 Colchicum poeltianum (U.Mull.-Doblies & D.Mull.-Doblies) J.C.Manning & Vinn. endemic
 Colchicum praeirroratum (U.Mull.-Doblies & D.Mull.-Doblies) J.C.Manning & Vinn. endemic
 Colchicum scabromarginatum (Schltr. & K.Krause) J.C.Manning & Vinn. endemic
 Colchicum stirtonii (U.Mull.-Doblies & D.Mull.-Doblies) J.C.Manning & Vinn. endemic
 Colchicum striatum (Hochst. ex A.Rich.) J.C.Manning & Vinn. indigenous
 Colchicum swazicum (U.Mull.-Doblies & D.Mull.-Doblies) J.C.Manning & Vinn. indigenous
 Colchicum undulatum (U.Mull.-Doblies & D.Mull.-Doblies) J.C.Manning & Vinn. endemic
 Colchicum vanjaarsveldii (U.Mull.-Doblies, Hahnl. U.U.Mull.-Doblies & D.Mull.-Doblies) J.C.Manning, endemic
 Colchicum villosum (U.Mull.-Doblies & D.Mull.-Doblies) J.C.Manning & Vinn. endemic
 Colchicum volutare (Burch.) J.C.Manning & Vinn. endemic
 Colchicum walteri (Pedrola, Membrives & J.M.Monts.) J.C.Manning & Vinn. indigenous
 Colchicum worsonense (U.Mull.-Doblies & D.Mull.-Doblies) J.C.Manning & Vinn. endemic

Gloriosa
Genus Gloriosa:
 Gloriosa modesta (Hook.) J.C.Manning & Vinn. indigenous
 Gloriosa rigidifolia (Bredell) J.C.Manning & Vinn. endemic
 Gloriosa superba L. indigenous

Hexacyrtis
Genus Hexacyrtis:
 Hexacyrtis dickiana Dinter, indigenous

Iphigenia
Genus Iphigenia:
 Iphigenia bechuanica Baker, accepted as Iphigenia oliveri Engl. indigenous
 Iphigenia oliveri Engl. indigenous

Littonia
Genus Littonia:
 Littonia modesta Hook. accepted as Gloriosa modesta (Hook.) J.C.Manning & Vinn. indigenous
 Littonia rigidifolia Bredell, accepted as Gloriosa rigidifolia (Bredell) J.C.Manning & Vinn. endemic

Neodregea
Genus Neodregea:
 Neodregea glassii C.H.Wright, accepted as Wurmbea glassii (C.H.Wright) J.C.Manning & Vinn. endemic

Onixotis
Genus Onixotis:
 Onixotis punctata (L.) Mabb. accepted as Wurmbea punctata (L.) J.C.Manning & Vinn. endemic
 Onixotis stricta (Burm.f.) Wijnands, accepted as Wurmbea stricta (Burm.f.) J.C.Manning & Vinn. endemic
 Onixotis triquetra (L.f.) Mabb. accepted as Wurmbea stricta (Burm.f.) J.C.Manning & Vinn. present

Ornithoglossum
Genus Ornithoglossum:
 Ornithoglossum dinteri K.Krause, indigenous
 Ornithoglossum gracile B.Nord. endemic
 Ornithoglossum parviflorum B.Nord. indigenous
 Ornithoglossum parviflorum B.Nord. var. namaquense B.Nord. endemic
 Ornithoglossum parviflorum B.Nord. var. parviflorum, indigenous
 Ornithoglossum undulatum Sweet, indigenous
 Ornithoglossum viride (L.f.) Aiton, endemic
 Ornithoglossum vulgare B.Nord. indigenous
 Ornithoglossum zeyheri (Baker) B.Nord. endemic

Sandersonia
Genus Sandersonia:
 Sandersonia aurantiaca Hook. indigenous

Wurmbea
Genus Wurmbea:
 Wurmbea angustifolia B.Nord. indigenous
 Wurmbea burttii B.Nord. indigenous
 Wurmbea capensis Thunb. endemic
 Wurmbea capensis Thunb. var. inusta Baker, accepted as Wurmbea inusta (Baker) B.Nord. present
 Wurmbea capensis Thunb. var. latifolia (Baker) Baker, accepted as Wurmbea variabilis B.Nord. present
 Wurmbea capensis Thunb. var. longiflora (Baker) Baker, accepted as Wurmbea dolichantha B.Nord. present
 Wurmbea capensis Thunb. var. purpurea (Aiton) Baker, accepted as Wurmbea marginata (Desr.) B.Nord. present
 Wurmbea capensis Thunb. var. truncata (Schltdl.) Baker, accepted as Wurmbea monopetala (L.f.) B.Nord. present
 Wurmbea compacta B.Nord. endemic
 Wurmbea dolichantha B.Nord. endemic
 Wurmbea elatior B.Nord. indigenous
 Wurmbea elongata B.Nord. endemic
 Wurmbea glassii (C.H.Wright) J.C.Manning & Vinn. endemic
 Wurmbea hiemalis B.Nord. endemic
 Wurmbea inusta (Baker) B.Nord. endemic
 Wurmbea kraussii Baker, indigenous
 Wurmbea marginata (Desr.) B.Nord. endemic
 Wurmbea minima B.Nord. endemic
 Wurmbea monopetala (L.f.) B.Nord. endemic
 Wurmbea punctata (L.) J.C.Manning & Vinn. endemic
 Wurmbea pusilla E.Phillips, indigenous
 Wurmbea recurva B.Nord. endemic
 Wurmbea robusta B.Nord. endemic
 Wurmbea spicata (Burm.f.) T.Durand & Schinz, indigenous
 Wurmbea spicata (Burm.f.) T.Durand & Schinz var. spicata, endemic
 Wurmbea spicata (Burm.f.) T.Durand & Schinz var. ustulata (B.Nord.) B.Nord. endemic
 Wurmbea stricta (Burm.f.) J.C.Manning & Vinn. endemic
 Wurmbea tenuis (Hook.f.) Baker, indigenous
 Wurmbea tenuis (Hook.f.) Baker subsp. australis B.Nord. indigenous
 Wurmbea variabilis B.Nord. endemic

Liliaceae
Family: Liliaceae,

Lilium
Genus Lilium:
 Lilium formosanum Wallace, not indigenous, naturalised, invasive

Orchiastrum
Genus Orchiastrum:
 Orchiastrum aitonii Lem. accepted as Lachenalia orchioides (L.) Aiton subsp. orchioides, indigenous
 Orchiastrum glaucinum (Jacq.) Lem. accepted as Lachenalia orchioides (L.) Aiton subsp. glaucina (Jacq.) G.D.Duncan, indigenous
 Orchiastrum mutabile (Lodd. ex Sweet) Lem. accepted as Lachenalia mutabilis Lodd. ex Sweet, indigenous
 Orchiastrum pallida (Aiton) Lem. accepted as Lachenalia pallida Aiton, indigenous
 Orchiastrum virentiflavum Lem. accepted as Lachenalia orchioides (L.) Aiton subsp. orchioides, indigenous

Scillopsis
Genus Scillopsis:
 Scillopsis anguinea Sweet, accepted as Lachenalia anguinea Sweet, indigenous
 Scillopsis angustifolia (Jacq.) Lem. accepted as Lachenalia contaminata Aiton, indigenous
 Scillopsis bifolia (Ker Gawl.) Lem. accepted as Lachenalia rosea Andrews, indigenous
 Scillopsis contanimata (Aiton) Lem. accepted as Lachenalia contaminata Aiton, indigenous
 Scillopsis fragrans (Jacq.) Lem. accepted as Lachenalia pallida Aiton, indigenous
 Scillopsis hyacinthoides (Jacq.) Lem. accepted as Lachenalia contaminata Aiton, indigenous
 Scillopsis isopetala (Jacq.) Lem. accepted as Lachenalia isopetala Jacq. indigenous
 Scillopsis liliiflora (Jacq.) Lem. accepted as Lachenalia liliiflora Jacq. indigenous
 Scillopsis lucida (Ker Gawl.) Lem. accepted as Lachenalia pallida Aiton, indigenous
 Scillopsis mediana (Jacq.) Lem. accepted as Lachenalia mediana Jacq. indigenous
 Scillopsis nervosa (Ker Gawl.) Lem. accepted as Lachenalia nervosa Ker Gawl. indigenous
 Scillopsis orthopetala (Jacq.) Lem. accepted as Lachenalia orthopetala Jacq. indigenous
 Scillopsis patula (Jacq.) Lem. accepted as Lachenalia patula Jacq. indigenous
 Scillopsis purpurea (Jacq.) Lem. accepted as Lachenalia pallida Aiton, indigenous
 Scillopsis purpureo-caerulea (Jacq.) Lem. accepted as Lachenalia purpureo-caerulea Jacq. indigenous
 Scillopsis pustulata (Jacq.) Lem. accepted as Lachenalia pallida Aiton, indigenous
 Scillopsis racemosa (Ker Gawl.) Lem. accepted as Lachenalia pallida Aiton, indigenous
 Scillopsis rosea (Andrews) Lem. accepted as Lachenalia rosea Andrews, indigenous
 Scillopsis unicolor (Jacq.) Lem. accepted as Lachenalia pallida Aiton, indigenous
 Scillopsis unifolia (Jacq.) Lem. accepted as Lachenalia unifolia Jacq. indigenous
 Scillopsis violacea (Jacq.) Lem. accepted as Lachenalia violacea Jacq. indigenous

Melanthiaceae
Family: Melanthiaceae,

Melanthium
Genus Melanthium:
 Melanthium massoniaefolium Andrews, accepted as Massonia bifolia (Jacq.) J.C.Manning & Goldblatt, indigenous

Smilacaceae
Family: Smilacaceae,

Smilax
Genus Smilax:
 Smilax anceps Willd. indigenous

References

South African plant biodiversity lists
Liliales